The Gewandhaus Quartet (German: Gewandhaus-Quartett) is a string quartet based in Leipzig. It was founded in 1808 by members of the Gewandhaus Orchester, as one of the first professional quartets in the world. In its more than 200-year history, they played many world premieres.

History 
In 1808, members of the Gewandhaus Orchester formed a string quartet, possibly following the model of the Schuppanzigh Quartet from Vienna, to play quartets mainly by Haydn, Mozart and Beethoven. Since then, it has been formed by concertmasters and players of the orchestra.

Players 
The original players were Heinrich August Matthäi (1781–1835), who is considered the quartet's founder, Bartolomeo Campagnoli (1751–1827), who was concertmaster at the time, violist Johann Georg Hermann Voigt (1769–1811) and cellist Friedrich Dotzauer (1783–1860). After Matthäi died in 1835, Ferdinand David (1810–1873) succeeded him, both as quartet primariu and as concertmaster.

In the course of its 200-year history, which was interrupted only shortly after the Second World War, the quartet had over 100 members. Important members were Carl Traugott Queisser (1800–1846), Joseph Joachim (1831–1907), Engelbert Röntgen (1829–1897), Julius Klengel (1859–1933), Gerhard Bosse (1922–2012) and Karl Suske (born in 1934).

In addition, the quartet has performed with important other soloists, including Clara Schumann, Johannes Brahms, Edvard Grieg, Felix Mendelssohn Bartholdy, Arthur Nikisch.

As of 2020 the members are:

 Frank-Michael Erben
 Conrad Suske
 Anton Jivaev
 Léonard Frey-Maibach

Premieres 
Claudius Böhm, who has researched the history of the quartet, argues that the Gewandhaus Quartet most likely played the world premiere of Beethoven's String Quartet, Op. 74, also Mendelssohn's string quartets, in D major, Op. 32, and in E flat major, Op. 44/3. They probably performed Schumann's String Quartet in A minor Op. 41/1 as well as his Piano Quintet in E flat major, Op. 44, and his Piano Quartet in E flat major, Op. 47. Further premiered compositions were by Niels Gade, Louis Spohr, Anton Rubinstein, Max Bruch, Salomon Jadassohn, Ethel Smyth, Felix Weingartner, Hermann Ambrosius, Antonín Dvořák, Siegfried Thiele, Günter Kochan, and others.

Awards 
 Preis der deutschen Schallplattenkritik
  2014

Sources 
 Claudius Böhm: Das Gewandhaus-Quartett. Kamprad, Altenburg 2008.

References

External links 
 
 Homepage Gewandhaus Quartet

German string quartets
1808 establishments
Recipients of the National Prize of East Germany